ESAC can refer to:

 Employer Services Assurance Corporation
 Entertainment Software Association of Canada
 Escola Superior Agrária de Coimbra
 European Space Astronomy Centre
 A Bash keyword that ends a case statement